6 High Street is an 18th-century building in Llandaff, Cardiff, Wales. It was possibly built as a one and a half storey building in the early 18th century of thick rubble masonry and in c. 1840 was extended to a three-storey building. It is thought to have been part of the old farm on The Cathedral Green, Llandaff, which was demolished in the early 19th century. Today the building is a teahouse. The building is a Grade II listed structure and it was listed because it is "Included as a largely C18 house and for its group value with the other listed buildings around The Cathedral Green and on the High Street."

References

External links
  High Street, 6, Llandaff
High Street, Llandaff